The Revd Isaac Johnson (1601 – 30 September 1630), a 17th-century English clergyman, was one of the Puritan founders of Massachusetts and the colony's First Magistrate.

Family background
Baptized at St John's Church, Stamford in Lincolnshire, the eldest son of Abraham Johnson, he grew up at Fineshade, near Luffenham. His grandfather was Archdeacon Robert Johnson, who founded Oakham and Uppingham Schools in Rutland.

After being educated at Emmanuel College, Cambridge (matriculating 1614, graduating B.A. 1617 and proceeding M.A. 1621) where a relative, Dr Laurence Chadderton, was inaugural Master, he was admitted to Gray's Inn in 1620. Johnson was then, on 27 May 1621, ordained a priest in the Church of England by Dr Thomas Dove, Bishop of Peterborough.

The Archdeacon settled upon his grandson the manor of Clipsham after his marriage in 1623 to Lady Arbella Clinton, second daughter of the 3rd Earl of Lincoln, whose brother (the 4th Earl) was a leading proponent of the Puritan colonisation of America.

Life
Johnson was the largest shareholder of the Massachusetts Bay Company and was one of the twelve signatories to the Cambridge Agreement on 29 August 1629. In 1630 he sailed with the Winthrop Fleet to America, arriving at Salem on 12 June. He was then one of the four founding patrons of the First Church at Charlestown on 30 July 1630 and provided the land for King's Chapel Burying Ground.

William Blaxton, his university contemporary, invited Johnson to Shawmut (now Boston), a move for which Blaxton offered to provide the finance. At a Charlestown meeting shortly before he died, Johnson renamed the settlement, previously known as Shawmut or Trimountain (on account of three contiguous hills which appear in a range when viewed from Charlestown), as Boston, after the port town in Lincolnshire in England where he lived with his wife before emigrating and his friend, Revd John Cotton, was Vicar of St Botolph's, Boston.

He died at Charlestown on 30 September 1630, the richest man in the colony. The Admiral (a ship in the Winthrop Fleet) was renamed Arbella after his wife, Lady Arbella Johnson, who predeceased him at Salem by one month.

See also
 New England Colonies

References

1601 births
1630 deaths
People from South Luffenham
People from Rutland
Alumni of Emmanuel College, Cambridge
17th-century English Anglican priests
New England Puritan ministers
Kingdom of England emigrants to Massachusetts Bay Colony
People of colonial Massachusetts
Burials in Boston